Moe Life is the third studio album by American rapper Big Moe from Houston, Texas. It was released on May 27, 2003 via Wreckshop Records. The album peaked at number 33 on the Top R&B/Hip-Hop Albums and number 29 on the Independent Albums in the US Billboard charts.

Track listing 

Sample credits
Track 4 contains elements from "Big Pimpin'" by Tha Dogg Pound
Track 12 contains elements from "Never Leave Me Alone" by Nate Dogg & Snoop Dogg
Track 16 contains elements from "Gigolos Get Lonely Too" by The Time

Charts

References

External links

2003 albums
Big Moe albums